A Guidance from Colour is the debut EP from the alternative rock band Twin Atlantic from Glasgow.    
  
A four-song EP recorded in 2007, it was released as a CD and digital download on 14 January 2008.

The first single released from the EP was "Audience and Audio" on 24 December 2007.

Track listing

Personnel

 Sam McTrusty – Guitar and Lead Vocals    
 Barry McKenna – Guitar, Cello and Backing Vocals    
 Ross McNae – Bass Guitar, Piano and Backing Vocals    
 Craig Kneale – Drums

2008 debut EPs
Twin Atlantic albums
Albums produced by Romesh Dodangoda